Bob Altena (born 11 February 1986 in Brunssum, Limburg) is a Dutch decathlete, whose greatest achievement was a ninth place at the 2004 World Junior Championships in Athletics.

External links
 
  

1986 births
Living people
Dutch decathletes
People from Brunssum
Sportspeople from Limburg (Netherlands)